The Hamas Covenant or Hamas Charter, formally known in English as the Covenant of the Islamic Resistance Movement, was originally issued on 18 August 1988 and outlines the founding identity, stand, and aims of Hamas (the Islamic Resistance Movement). A new charter was issued by Hamas leader Khaled Mashal on 1 May 2017 in Doha.

The original Charter identified Hamas as the Muslim Brotherhood in Palestine and declares its members to be Muslims who "fear God and raise the banner of Jihad in the face of the oppressors." The charter states that "our struggle against the Jews is very great and very serious" and calls for the eventual creation of an Islamic state in Palestine, in place of Israel and the Palestinian Territories, and the obliteration or dissolution of Israel. It emphasizes the importance of jihad, stating in article 13, "There is no solution for the Palestinian question except through Jihad. Initiatives, proposals and international conferences are all a waste of time and vain endeavors."
The charter also states that Hamas is humanistic, and tolerant of other religions as long as they "stop disputing the sovereignty of Islam in this region". The Charter adds that "renouncing any part of Palestine means renouncing part of the religion [of Islam]". The original charter was criticized for its violent language against all Jews, which some commentators characterized as incitement to genocide.

In 2008, the Hamas leader in Gaza, Ismail Haniyeh, stated that Hamas would agree to accept a Palestinian state along the 1967 borders, and to offer a long-term truce with Israel. In contrast to this, Hamas leader Mahmoud al-Zahar stated that any talk of the 1967 lines is "just a phase" until Hamas has a chance to "regain the land...even if we [Hamas] have to do so inch by inch." In 2009 interviews with the BBC, Tony Blair claimed that Hamas does not accept the existence of Israel and continues to pursue its objectives through terror and violence; Sir Jeremy Greenstock however argued that Hamas has not adopted its charter as part of its political program since it won the 2006 Palestinian legislative election.  Instead it has moved to a more secular stance. In 2010, Hamas leader Khaled Meshaal stated that the Charter is "a piece of history and no longer relevant, but cannot be changed for internal reasons." Hamas has moved away from its charter since it decided to run candidates for office.

The 2017 charter accepted for the first time the idea of a Palestinian state within the borders that existed before 1967 and rejects recognition of Israel which it terms as the "Zionist enemy". It advocates such a state as transitional but also advocates "liberation of all of Palestine". The new document also states that the group doesn't seek war with the Jewish people but only against Zionism which it holds responsible for "occupation of Palestine". Mashal also stated that Hamas was ending its association with the Muslim Brotherhood. After a new charter was scheduled to be issued in May 2017, Israeli Prime Minister Benjamin Netanyahu's office issued a statement in which it accused Hamas of trying to fool the world and also asked it to stop its terror activities for a true change.

Background
In 1987, twenty years after the Six-Day War, the First Intifada (1987–1993) began. In the late 1980s, the Palestine Liberation Organization sought a negotiated solution with Israel in the form of a two-state solution. This was not acceptable to Hamas, the Palestinian wing of the Muslim Brotherhood, and the covenant was written to bridge the ideological gap between the PLO and Muslim Brotherhood.  According to Hamas's Deputy Foreign Minister Dr. Ahmed Yousef, the Charter "was ratified during the unique circumstances of the Uprising in 1988 as a necessary framework for dealing with a relentless occupation".

While the PLO was nationalistic, it was more secular in nature, while Hamas subscribed to a neo-Salafi jihadi theology and nationalism.  Hamas was a shift from the Muslim Brotherhood's more universal Islamic vision to a focus on Palestinian nationalism and a strategy of armed struggle, or violent jihad. Its political goals were identical to those of the PLO's charter and was essentially an armed struggle to retrieve the entire land of Palestine as an Islamic waqf.

The movement later came under pressure to update its founding charter issued in 1988 which called for Israel's destruction and advocated violent means for achieving a Palestinian state. The original charter's tone and casting the Israeli-Palestinian conflict as part of an eternal struggle between Muslim and Jews became an obstacle for the movement to be able to take part in diplomatic forums involving Western nations. The new charter also sought to question the ability of Fatah and its leader Mahmoud Abbas to act as the sole legitimate representative for the Palestinians. In addition, its ties to the Muslim Brotherhood had also damaged relationship with Egypt which considers the movement to be a terrorist organisation.

Relevance in the 21st century
Dr. Ahmed Yousef, an adviser to Ismail Haniyeh (the senior political leader of Hamas), claimed that Hamas has changed its views over time since the charter was issued in 1988. In 2010 Hamas leader Khaled Meshaal stated that the Charter is "a piece of history and no longer relevant, but cannot be changed for internal reasons."

In 2006, Hamas proposed government programme, which stated that "the question of recognizing Israel is not the jurisdiction of one faction, nor the government, but a decision for the Palestinian people." However many remain sceptical of Hamas's new stance, and view it as a ploy to hide its true agenda, "but it is equally true that the "new" discourse of diluted religious content—to say nothing of the movement's increasing pragmatism and flexibility in the political domain—reflects genuine and cumulative changes within Hamas."

Contrastingly, Mahmoud Zahar, co-founder of Hamas, said in 2006 that Hamas "will not change a single word in its covenant." In 2010, he reaffirmed a major commitment of the covenant saying "Our ultimate plan is [to have] Palestine in its entirety. I say this loud and clear so that nobody will accuse me of employing political tactics. We will not recognize the Israeli enemy."

In 2011, Atallah Abu al-Subh, the former Hamas minister of culture, said that "the Jews are the most despicable and contemptible nation to crawl upon the face of the Earth, because they have displayed hostility to Allah. Allah will kill the Jews in the hell of the world to come, just like they killed the believers in the hell of this world."

Per Nathan Thrall, an analyst working for the International Crisis Group, the original charter had been a long source of embarrassment among the reformists in the movement.

Content

1988 charter
Article 1 describes Hamas as an Islamic Resistance Movement with an ideological programme of Islam.
Article 2 of Hamas' Charter defines Hamas as a "universal movement" and "one of the branches of the Muslim Brotherhood in Palestine".
Article 3 the Movement consists of "Muslims who have given their allegiance to Allah".
Article 4 the Movement "welcomes every Muslim who embraces its faith, ideology, follows its programme, keeps its secrets, and wants to belong to its ranks and carry out the duty," 
Article 5 Demonstrates its Salafist roots and connections to the Muslim brotherhood, declaring Islam as its official religion and the Koran as its constitution.
Article 6 Hamas is uniquely Palestinian, and "strives to raise the banner of Allah over every inch of Palestine, for under the wing of Islam followers of all religions can coexist in security and safety where their lives, possessions and rights are concerned." It claims that the world will descend into chaos and war without Islam, quoting Muhammad Iqbal.
Article 7  describes Hamas as "one of the links in the chain of the struggle against the Zionist invaders" and claims continuity with the followers of the religious and nationalist hero Izz ad-Din al-Qassam from the Great Arab Revolt as well as the Palestinian combatants of the First Arab-Israeli War. It adds a hadith claiming that at the Day of Judgment all Jews will be killed.
Article 8 The Hamas document reiterates the Muslim Brotherhood's slogan of "Allah is its goal, the Prophet is the model, the Qur'an its constitution, jihad its path, and death for the sake of Allah its most sublime belief."
Article 9 adapts Muslim Brotherhood's vision to connect the Palestinian crisis with the Islamic solution and advocates "fighting against the false, defeating it and vanquishing it so that justice could prevail".
Article 11 Palestine is sacred (waqf) for all Muslims for all time, and it cannot be relinquished by anyone.
Article 12 affirms that "Nationalism, from the point of view of the Islamic Resistance Movement, is part of the religious creed".
Article 13 There is no negotiated settlement possible. Jihad is the only answer.
Article 14 The liberation of Palestine is the personal duty of every Palestinian.
Article 15 "The day that enemies usurp part of Muslim land, Jihad becomes the individual duty of every Muslim". It states the history of the Crusades into Muslim lands and says the "Palestinian problem is a religious problem."
Article 16 Describes how to go about educating future generations, with an emphasis on religious studies and Islamic history.
Article 17 Declares the role of women in Islamic society to be the "maker of men." It condemns Western organizations such as the Freemasons, Rotary Clubs, and intelligence agencies as "saboteurs" for promoting subversive ideas on women. 
Article 18 Defines the role of women as homemakers and child-rearers, providing education and moral guidance to men. 
Article 19 Promotes the value of art while promoting Islamic art over "Jahili" art forms.
Article 20 Calls for action "by the people as a single body" against "a vicious enemy which acts in a way similar to Nazism, making no differentiation between man and woman, between children and old people".
Article 21 Promotes "mutual social responsibility" and urges members "to consider the interests of the masses as their own personal interests."
Article 22 Makes sweeping claims about Jewish influence and power. It specifically claims that the Jews were responsible for instigating multiple revolutions and wars, including the French Revolution, World War I, and the Russian Revolution. It also claims that Jews control the United Nations, and that they are supported by "the imperialistic forces in the Capitalist West and Communist East." 
Article 23 Expresses support for all Islamic movements "if they reveal good intentions and dedication to Allah."
Article 24 Prohibits "slandering or speaking ill of individuals or groups." 
Article 25 Discourages Islamic movements from seeking foreign support and expresses support for other Palestinian nationalist movements.
Article 26 Allows consultation with other Palestinian movements that are neutral in international affairs. 
Article 27 Praises the PLO but condemns its secularism. 
Article 28 Conspiracy charges against Israel and the whole of the Jewish people: "Israel, Judaism and Jews". It claims that "Zionist organizations" aim to destroy society through moral corruption and eliminating Islam, and are responsible for drug trafficking and alcoholism. 
Article 30: Calls on "writers, intellectuals, media people, orators, educaters and teachers, and all the various sectors in the Arab and Islamic world" to pursue jihad. 
Article 31 Describes Hamas as "a humanistic movement", which "takes care of human rights and is guided by Islamic tolerance when dealing with the followers of other religions". "Under the wing of Islam", it is possible for Islam, Christianity and Judaism "to coexist in peace and quiet with each other" provided that members of other religions do not dispute the sovereignty of Islam in the region.
Article 32 Hamas condemns as co-plotters the "imperialistic powers" seeking to corrupt all Arab countries one by one, leaving Palestine as the final bastion of Islam. References The Protocols of the Elders of Zion.
Article 33 calls upon Muslims worldwide to work for liberation of Palestine.
Article 34 represents the Temple Mount in Jerusalem as the axis mundi, the sacred point where divine cosmology and temporal history meet. Along with Article 35 it compares Israel with an imperialist-colonialist movement. The articles reflect and draws upon past examples of Crusader and Mongol invasions, both of which initially were successful but were eventually repelled.
Article 36 outlines the goals of Hamas.

Statements about Israel

The Preamble to the 1988 Charter stated: ″Israel will exist and will continue to exist until Islam invalidates it, just as it invalidated others before it″.

Antisemitism

Ideology
According to Abraham Foxman of the Anti-Defamation League, "The Hamas credo is not just anti-Israel, but profoundly anti-Semitic with racism at its core. The Hamas Charter reads like a modern-day Mein Kampf." According to the charter, Jewish people "have only negative traits and are presented as planning to take over the world." The 1988 Charter claimed that the Jews deserved God's/Allah's enmity and wrath because they received the Scriptures but violated its sacred texts, disbelieved the signs of Allah, and slew their own prophets. It quotes a saying of Muhammad from a hadith:

Multiple commentators, including Jeffrey Goldberg and Philip Gourevitch, have identified this passage as incitement to genocide.

Militant Jihad
The 1988 Charter went further in detailing how Jihad against the Jews was a duty. "The day that enemies usurp part of Moslem land, Jihad becomes the individual duty of every Moslem. In face of the Jews' usurpation of Palestine, it is compulsory that the banner of Jihad be raised. To do this requires the diffusion of Islamic consciousness among the masses, both on the regional, Arab and Islamic levels. It is necessary to instill the spirit of Jihad in the heart of the nation so that they would confront the enemies and join the ranks of the fighters."

Antisemitic canards
The 1988 charter contained references to antisemitic canards, such as the assertion that through shrewd manipulation of imperial countries and secret societies, Jews were behind a wide range of events and disasters going as far back in history as the French Revolution.

With their money, they took control of the world media, news agencies, the press, publishing houses, broadcasting stations, and others. With their money they stirred revolutions in various parts of the world with the purpose of achieving their interests and reaping the fruit therein. They were behind the French Revolution, the Communist revolution and most of the revolutions we heard and hear about, here and there. With their money, they formed secret societies, such as Freemason, Rotary Clubs, the Lions and others in different parts of the world for the purpose of sabotaging societies and achieving Zionist interests. With their money they were able to control imperialistic countries and instigate them to colonize many countries in order to enable them to exploit their resources and spread corruption there.

It continued by accusing the Jews of engineering World War I as a pretext to abolish the Caliphate, create the League of Nations, and influence the British government into drafting the Balfour Declaration. It echoed Nazi propaganda in claiming that Jews profited during World War II.

Violence against Jews
The 1988 document also quoted Islamic religious texts to provide justification for fighting against and killing the Jews, without distinction of whether they were in Israel or elsewhere. It presented the Arab–Israeli conflict as an inherently irreconcilable struggle between Jews and Muslims, and Judaism and Islam, adding that the only way to engage in this struggle between "truth and falsehood" was through Islam and by means of jihad, until victory or martyrdom.

Equivalence of anti-Zionism and antisemitism
Historian Jeffrey Herf argued that unlike the PLO, which has distinguished their national struggle against Zionism from general antisemitism (rhetorically, at least), Hamas, in their covenant, purposefully fused these two struggles into one against the Jews and their country.

See also
 Contemporary imprints of The Protocols of the Elders of Zion
 Fatah–Hamas conflict
 Human rights in the Palestinian territories
 Islamic fundamentalism
 List of political parties in the State of Palestine
 Palestinian political violence
Incitement to genocide

References

External links
 An English translation of the 1988 Covenant
 Official translation of the 2017 Charter

Covenant
1988 establishments in the Israeli Civil Administration area
1988 documents
2017 documents
History of Palestine (region)
Politics of the Palestinian National Authority
Anti-Zionism in the Palestinian territories
Islam and antisemitism
Muslim Brotherhood
Jihad
Palestinian politics
Party platforms